The Qingtian dialect is a dialect of the Chinese language. It is spoken in Qingtian county of Lishui prefecture in Zhejiang, China. The Qingtian dialect is one of the Chuqu dialects of Wu Chinese spoken in Quzhou and Lishui prefectures of Zhejiang.

References

External links
 A Study on the Phonetics of the Qingtian Dialect

Wu Chinese